"Guiding Light" is a song by English rock band Mumford & Sons. It was released as the lead single from their fourth studio album, Delta, on 20 September 2018. The song has peaked at number 40 on the UK Singles Chart.

Background
The song was first played live at Sziget Festival 2018, as one of three new songs the band played. On 19 September 2018, an audio snippet from the song was released on the band's Twitter page. Guiding Light premiered on 20 September 2018 on BBC Radio 1. Speaking to Annie Mac on Radio 1 about the single, Marcus Mumford said: "It was a bit of a beast to try and get on record. It was hard work. We kind of tried it in loads of different ways...this one took a while. We wrote it like a year ago, but it’s taken a while to just get it to that point and now we're happy with it." A lyric video was released simultaneously with the premiere of the track. The song made its television debut on the Tonight Show with Jimmy Fallon, and was later played on The Graham Norton Show, Saturday Night Live, and BBC Live Lounge, with acoustic performances at Radio.com and Sirius XM.

Composition
Elizabeth Aubrey of NME described "Guiding Light" as a "dizzying folk-rock song that builds, builds, explodes and then explodes again". Joshua Copperman of Spin dubbed it a "solid folk-pop song". Jon Dolan of Rolling Stone described the song as having "angelic electronics" and instrumentation that recalls "West African guitar blues".

Music video
The official video premiered on 17 October 2018; it uses footage from the band's mini-concert, originally filmed outside the Tate Modern in London on 21 September 2018.

Track listing

Charts

Weekly charts

Year-end charts

Certifications

Release history

References

2018 singles
2018 songs
Mumford & Sons songs
Songs written by Marcus Mumford
Songs written by Winston Marshall
Songs written by Ben Lovett (British musician)
Songs written by Ted Dwane